HMAS Polaris was a trawler requisitioned by the Royal Australian Navy in 1942 as a survey tender.

Construction
Designed by Harry DeWall, Head Shipwright at W.L. Holmes & Co. Boatyard.  

It was built at their McMahon's Point Boatyard in Sydney, Australia.

In 1939 the Keel was laid and had a construction cost £5750.

Service
Their first job was to survey the sea route from Milne Bay to Oro Bay, Papua and they came under attack from Japanese bombers off Cape Nelson on 2 January 1943. Polaris was paid off on 5 November 1945 and returned to her owners.

Polaris was awarded the battle honour "New Guinea 1942–43".

Notes

Survey ships of the Royal Australian Navy